International Trade Center 260, formerly known as Asia Rich Tower, is a skyscraper office building located in North District, Taichung, Taiwan. The building was originally completed in 2001 as Asia Rich Tower, but was later renovated and changed its name to International Trade Center 260, but keeping its Chinese name the same. In 2010, the façades of the building were demolished and modifications were performed on the walls whilst maintaining the main structure of the previous building. The original building had a green façade and the renovated building has a white façade with vertical black stripes. The renovation process was completed in 2013. 

As of January 2021, the building is the tallest in the district and 25th tallest in the city.

See also 
 List of tallest buildings in Taiwan
 List of tallest buildings in Taichung

References

2001 establishments in Taiwan
Buildings and structures in Taichung
Skyscraper office buildings in Taichung
Office buildings completed in 2001